John W. Yolton (1921–2005) was an American historian of philosophy.

He taught at Rutgers University from 1978 to 1992, and was a dean from 1978 to 1985. He authored or edited 15 books, several of which were about John Locke.

Early life
Yolton was born in 1921 in Birmingham, Alabama. He earned a bachelor's degree from the University of Cincinnati, a master's degree from the University of California, Berkeley, and a DPhil from Balliol College, Oxford.

Career
Yolton taught at Johns Hopkins University, the University of Baltimore, Princeton University, Kenyon College, the University of Maryland, and York University. He was a professor in the Philosophy department at Rutgers University from 1978 to 1992, and a dean from 1978 to 1985.

Yolton was the author or editor of 15 books, several of which were about John Locke.

Personal life and death
Yolton had a wife, Jean. He died on November 3, 2005 in New Brunswick, New Jersey.

Selected works

References

1921 births
2005 deaths
Writers from Birmingham, Alabama
University of Cincinnati alumni
University of California, Berkeley alumni
Alumni of Balliol College, Oxford
Rutgers University faculty
American historians of philosophy
20th-century American philosophers
American university and college faculty deans
Presidents of the Canadian Philosophical Association
20th-century American academics